Rolf Anker Ims (born 19 May 1958) is a Norwegian ecologist.

He was born in Oslo. He took the dr.philos. degree in 1989, and was appointed as a professor of landscape ecology at the University of Oslo in 1992. In 2001 he moved to the University of Tromsø. He became a member of the Norwegian Academy of Science and Letters in 2000.

References

1958 births
Living people
Norwegian ecologists
Scientists from Oslo
Academic staff of the University of Oslo
Academic staff of the University of Tromsø
Members of the Norwegian Academy of Science and Letters